Marcel Vibert (2 November 1883 – 11 June 1959) was a French film actor. Vibert worked primarily in the French film industry, but in the late 1920s he also appeared in several British silent films including Moulin Rouge and Champagne.

On 14 October 1930, Vibert married actress Hélène Darly.

Selected filmography
 Flanders under Philip II (1923)
 Little Jacques (1923)
 Terror (1924)
 Nitchevo (1926)
 The Garden of Allah (1927)
 Moulin Rouge (1928)
 Champagne (1928)
 Life (1928)
 Bright Eyes (1929)
 The Three Masks (1929)
 The Merry Widower (1929)
 The Hero of Every Girl's Dream (1929)
 Hai-Tang (1930)
 Atlantis (1930)
 The Mystery of the Yellow Room (1930)
 Princess, At Your Orders! (1931)
 The Perfume of the Lady in Black (1931)
 The Lacquered Box (1932)
 Princesse Czardas (1934)
 Miss Bonaparte (1942)
 Forces occultes (1943)
 The Queen's Necklace (1946)
Coincidences (1947)

References

Bibliography
 St. Pierre, Paul Matthew. E.A. Dupont and his Contribution to British Film: Varieté, Moulin Rouge, Piccadilly, Atlantic, Two Worlds, Cape Forlorn. Fairleigh Dickinson University Press, 2010

External links

1883 births
1959 deaths
French male film actors
French male silent film actors
French male stage actors
Male actors from Paris
20th-century French male actors